The 50th General Assembly of Prince Edward Island was in session from March 14, 1963, to April 14, 1966. The Progressive Conservative Party led by Walter Russell Shaw formed the government.

John R. MacLean was elected speaker. Frank Myers replaced MacLean as speaker in 1965.

There were four sessions of the 50th General Assembly:

Members

Kings

Prince

Queens

Notes:

References
 Election results for the Prince Edward Island Legislative Assembly, 1962-12-10
 O'Handley, Kathryn Canadian Parliamentary Guide, 1994 

Terms of the General Assembly of Prince Edward Island
1963 establishments in Prince Edward Island
1966 disestablishments in Prince Edward Island